Bonxie is the third and final studio album by British indie rock band Stornoway. It was released in April 2015 under Cooking Vinyl. The title refers to the great skua seabird, which in Shetland is colloquially referred to as a bonxie. It is one of several references to birds on the album, which also includes birdsong on many of the tracks, in a nod to lead singer Brian Briggs' academic background in ornithology and his love of birds in general.

Track listing

Critical reception
The album was generally well received by the British press. Guardian critic Dave Simpson gave it five out of five stars, describing it as 'big music, which deserves the largest stage'. Paul Mardles in the same newspaper said it 'indicates the four-piece's future lies beyond the confines of jaunty folk-pop'. It was also positively reviewed by Q, Mojo, and Uncut magazines.

References

2015 albums
Cooking Vinyl albums
Stornoway (band) albums